Tōkyō 25th district is a constituency of the House of Representatives in the Diet of Japan. It is located in the westernmost part of Tokyo prefecture. In of 2012, 321,319 eligible voters were registered in the district giving it the highest vote weight in Tokyo – several districts in former Tokyo city in Eastern Tokyo have more than 450,000 voters – but still more than 1.5 times as many voters as the least populated electoral districts in Japan.

The district covers the mostly rural Nishitama District as well as the cities of Ōme, Fussa, Akiruno and Hamura. After redistricting in 2017 the city of Akishima was transferred to the 25th district from the Tokyo 21st district.

Before the electoral reform of 1994, the area had been part of Tokyo 11th district that elected five Representatives by single non-transferable vote.

Since its creation, Tokyo 25th district has been a relatively safe seat for the Liberal Democratic Party and withstood the landslide Democratic victory in the 2009 general election. Its first representative, former defence minister Yōzō Ishikawa (Miyazawa→Kōno faction (present-day Asō faction)) who had represented the pre-reform 11th district since 1976, was succeeded by Shinji Inoue (Asō faction), a former MLIT bureaucrat.

List of representatives

Election results

References 

Politics of Tokyo
Districts of the House of Representatives (Japan)